Faveria griseopuncta is a species of moth in the family Pyralidae. It was described by Marianne Horak in 1997. It is found in the Australian state of Queensland.

References

Moths described in 1997
Phycitini
Moths of Australia
Taxa named by Marianne Horak